Flint Boroughs (sometimes known as Flint or the Flint District of Boroughs) was a parliamentary constituency in north-east Wales which returned one Member of Parliament (MP) to the House of Commons of the Parliament of the United Kingdom and its predecessors, from 1542 until it was abolished for the 1918 general election.

Boundaries
From its first known general election in 1542 until 1918, the constituency consisted of a number of boroughs within the historic county of Flintshire in north-east Wales. The seat should not be confused with the county constituency of Flintshire, which existed from the 16th century until 1950.

After 1918 Flintshire was represented in Parliament by the single member county constituency, which included all the boroughs formerly in the Flint District of Boroughs.

Flint 1535–1832
On the basis of information from several volumes of the History of Parliament, it is apparent that the history of the borough representation of Wales and Monmouthshire is more complicated than that of the English boroughs.

The Laws in Wales Act 1535 (26 Hen. VIII, c. 26) provided for a single borough seat for each of 11 of the 12 Welsh counties and Monmouthshire. The legislation was ambiguous as to which communities were enfranchised. The county towns were awarded a seat, but these seats in some way represented all the ancient boroughs of the county, as the boroughs other than county towns were also required to contribute to the members' wages. It is not clear whether the burgesses of the contributing boroughs could vote in the election. The only election under the original scheme was that for the 1542 Parliament. It seems that only burgesses from the county towns actually took part. An Act of 1544 (35 Hen. VIII, c. 11) confirmed that the contributing boroughs could send representatives to take part in the election at the county town. As far as can be told from surviving indentures of returns, the degree to which the out boroughs participated varied, but by the end of the 16th century all the seats had some participation from them at some elections at least.

The original scheme was modified by later legislation and decisions of the House of Commons (which were sometimes made with no regard to precedent or evidence: for example in 1728 it was decided that only the freemen of the borough of Montgomery could participate in the election for that seat, thus disenfranchising the freemen of Llanidloes, Welshpool and Llanfyllin).

In the case of Flintshire, the county town was Flint. The out boroughs were Caergwrle, Caerwys, Overton and Rhuddlan.

In 1690–1715 the freemen of the five boroughs were entitled to vote. The exact number is unknown, but in the only poll of the period (a by-election in 1697) there were 760 voters.

Between 1715 and 1754 the House of Commons changed the franchise of the constituency. In 1727 there were about 1000 freemen entitled to vote. Thereafter the inhabitants of the five boroughs, paying scot and lot (a local tax), formed the electorate. They numbered about 600.

From 1754 to 1790, there were still about 600 voters. Namier and Brooke point out that the constituency was controlled by local squires. No election went to a poll in that period.

Flint Boroughs 1832–1918
The Flint Boroughs was a district of boroughs constituency, which grouped a number of parliamentary boroughs in Flintshire into one single member constituency. The voters from each participating borough cast ballots, which were added together over the whole district to decide the result of the poll. The enfranchised communities in this district, from 1832, were the eight boroughs of Flint, Caergwrle, Caerwys, Holywell, Mold, Overton, Rhuddlan and St Asaph.

The boundaries of the parliamentary boroughs in the district were altered by the Parliamentary Boundaries Act 1868, but the general nature of the constituency was unchanged. There were no further boundary changes in the 1885 redistribution of parliamentary seats.

Members of Parliament

Members of Parliament 1542–1640
As there were sometimes significant gaps between Parliaments held in this period, the dates of first assembly and dissolution are given. Where the name of the member has not yet been ascertained or is not recorded in a surviving document, the entry unknown is entered in the table.

Members of Parliament 1640–1660
This sub-section includes the Long Parliament and the Rump Parliament, together with the Parliaments of the Commonwealth and the Protectorate (before the Convention Parliament of 1660).

Members of Parliament 1660–1918

Supplemental Notes:-
 1 F. W. S. Craig, in his compilations of election results for Great Britain, classifies Whig, Radical and similar candidates as Liberals from 1832. The name Liberal was gradually adopted as a description for the Whigs and politicians allied with them, before the formal creation of the Liberal Party shortly after the 1859 general election.

Election results 1690-1713

Sources 1690–1715: Cruickshanks et al.; 1715–1754: Stooks Smith; 1754–1784: Namier and Brooke; 1784–1832 Stooks Smith. Positive swing is from Whig to Tory.
Source 1832–1918: Craig. Positive swing is from Liberal to Conservative.

 Death of Puleston

 Seat vacant at dissolution, on the death of Ravenscroft

 Hanmer was also returned by and elected to sit for Thetford

 Mostyn was also returned by and elected to sit for Cheshire

Election results 1800-1832

Elections in the 1830s

Lloyd was elevated to the peerage, becoming 1st Baron Mostyn and causing a by-election.

Glynne resigned, causing a by-election.

Election results 1832-1868

Elections in the 1830s

Elections in the 1840s

Elections in the 1850s

Elections in the 1860s

Election results 1868-1880

Elections in the 1860s

Elections in the 1870s 

Hanmer was raised to the peerage, becoming Lord Hanmer.

 

Eyton's death caused a by-election.

Elections in the 1880s

Election results 1885-1918

Elections in the 1880s

Elections in the 1890s

Elections in the 1900s

Elections in the 1910s

General Election 1914–15:

Another General Election was required to take place before the end of 1915. The political parties had been making preparations for an election to take place and by the July 1914, the following candidates had been selected; 
Liberal: Tom Parry
Unionist: J. Hamlet Roberts

References

 Boundaries of Parliamentary Constituencies 1885–1972, compiled and edited by F.W.S. Craig (Parliamentary Reference Publications 1972)
 British Parliamentary Election Results 1832–1885, compiled and edited by F.W.S. Craig (Macmillan Press 1977)
 British Parliamentary Election Results 1885–1918, compiled and edited by F.W.S. Craig (Macmillan Press 1974)
 The House of Commons 1509–1558, by S.T. Bindoff (Secker & Warburg 1982)
 The House of Commons 1558–1603, by P.W. Hasler (HMSO 1981)
 The House of Commons 1690–1715, by Eveline Cruickshanks, Stuart Handley and D.W. Hayton (Cambridge University Press 2002)
 The House of Commons 1715–1754, by Romney Sedgwick (HMSO 1970)
 The House of Commons 1754–1790, by Sir Lewis Namier and John Brooke (HMSO 1964)
 The Parliaments of England by Henry Stooks Smith (1st edition published in three volumes 1844–50), second edition edited (in one volume) by F.W.S. Craig (Political Reference Publications 1973)

History of Flintshire
Historic parliamentary constituencies in North Wales
Constituencies of the Parliament of the United Kingdom established in 1542
Constituencies of the Parliament of the United Kingdom disestablished in 1918